The 1st African-American Film Critics Association Awards, honoring the best in filmmaking of 2003, were given on 22 December 2003.

Top 10 films
 The Lord of the Rings: The Return of the King
 Lost in Translation
 In America
 Dirty Pretty Things
 The Last Samurai
 Finding Nemo
 The Italian Job
 Tupac: Resurrection
 Cidade de Deus (City of God)
 Mystic River

Winners
Special Achievement Award:
F. Gary Gray - The Italian Job

References
HighBeam

2003 film awards
African-American Film Critics Association Awards